Wolryche is a surname. Notable people with the surname include:

Surname
 Wolryche baronets
 Sir Thomas Wolryche, 1st Baronet (1598–1668), English landowner and politician

Given name
 Brig.-Gen. Thomas Wolryche Stansfeld (1877–1935), English army officer